CHBP may refer to:
 Capitol Hill Block Party
 N,N'-diacetylchitobiose phosphorylase, an enzyme